Edgewise is the eighth album led by jazz pianist and mathematician Rob Schneiderman, released on the Reservoir label in 2001.

Reception

In his review on All About Jazz, C. Andrew Hovan stated "Schneiderman’s art is one of understated elegance and over the course of his previous eight Reservoir sides he has evolved into a singular pianist of great merit. This new affair is simply a trio date with bassist Ray Drummond and drummer Winard Harper, although there’s nothing routine about the results." In his review on Jazz Times, Miles Jordan opined "...Schneiderman’s playing won’t make us forget Powell but it’s nice to be reminded of him."

Track listing

Track listing adapted from AllMusic.

Credits

 Ray Drummond - Bass
 B. Robert Johnson - Design, Photography
 Winard Harper, Drums
 Kayla Feldman - Executive Producer
 Allan Tucker - Mastereing
 Rob Schneiderman - Piano 
 Mark Feldman - Producer
 Jim Anderson - Engineer [Recording]
 Ross Peterson - Engineer [Assistant]
 Andrew Gilbert, Liner notes (2)

References

Rob Schneiderman albums
2001 albums